Brad Mangin is a Bay Area freelance sports photographer. Mangin has done eight cover shots for Sports Illustrated. Mangin graduated from San Jose State in a degree in photojournalism.

References

External links
Brad Mangin
Sports Photography and Photojournalism for Professional Photographers| SportsShooter.com

Sports photographers
American sports journalists
American photojournalists
Living people
Year of birth missing (living people)